Notre Dame Catholic School was a Roman Catholic high school, middle school, and elementary school in Wichita Falls, Texas.  It was located in the Roman Catholic Diocese of Fort Worth.

Notre Dame Catholic School was one school on two campuses.  The lower campus accommodated pre-K through 5th grade.  The upper campus accommodated 6th through 12th grade.  The traditions of the institution were drawn from the Sisters of Saint Mary of Namur who, in 1904, founded the original school which was known as the Academy of Mary Immaculate.  The Congregation of the Holy Cross who joined the Sisters of Saint Mary when the school was broadened to include high school age boys.  The original school, which stood on the corner of Holliday and Ninth Streets, was the center of Catholic education in North Central Texas, being the only Catholic school from Fort Worth, 114 miles to the southeast, to Clarendon, 118 miles to the northwest.  The present elementary school campus opened in the Fall of 1954 and was known as Our Lady Queen of Peace Parish School.  In 1968, Sacred Heart Parish School merged with Our Lady Queen of Peace Parish School, creating a multi-parish school.  Today, students attend from these parishes, as well as most of the Catholic parishes in the three-county metro area. In March of 2021, the Diocese of Fort Worth announced that the school would be shut down at the end of the school year. The school is now demolished, with the elementary school remaining.

External links
 Official website

Notes and references

Catholic secondary schools in Texas
1904 establishments in Texas
Educational institutions established in 1904
High schools in Wichita Falls, Texas
Private K-12 schools in Texas